Que No Me Faltes Tú Y Muchos Éxitos Más is the fifth album by the Mexican singer Mariana Seoane, launched in 2007.

Track listing
 Que No Me Faltes Tu
 No Vuelvo Contigo
 Que Rico
 Que Mal Eligiste
 El Pueblo
 El Amor de Tu Vida
 Me Equivoque
 Si Te Vas
 Como Tu Sabes
 Que Nos Paso
 Ahora Vete
 No es Normal

References

Mariana Seoane albums
2007 albums